Sayyid Zainal Abidin Ali Khan Bahadur was the son of Nawab Nazim Ashraf Ali Khan of Bengal by his Mut‘ah wife, Sharaf-un-nisa Khanum. He died in February, 1826 at Murshidabad.

Nawabs of Bengal
19th-century Indian monarchs
Year of birth unknown
1826 deaths